Brian Timmis Stadium was a soccer stadium in Hamilton, Ontario. The stadium was built in 1968, and seated 5,000 people.  The stadium most recently hosted association football (soccer) teams Hamilton Croatia, a Canadian Soccer League club, and the Hamilton Avalanche, a club that played in the W-League of the United Soccer Leagues. It was located next to Ivor Wynne Stadium.

Named after CFL player Brian Timmis, the stadium also previously hosted soccer teams the Hamilton Steelers and the Hamilton Thunder before the franchises folded.

Prior to 1968 the site was home to Scott Park baseball field built in 1925. The grandstand was demolished and converted into a soccer pitch. Today it is the public square for Tim Hortons Field.

References

Defunct soccer venues in Canada
Sports venues in Hamilton, Ontario